Jamie Franks is a US Navy Veteran and a competitive shooter known for being on the History Channel's marksmen competition show Top Shot. After performing well in Season 2, Franks was invited back to compete on Top Shot Allstars. Since competing on Top Shot, Franks has focused more on competitive shooting and has become a fierce competitor in multi gun.

Background 

Jamie Franks grew up in a rural area outside of Raleigh, North Carolina in a family of hunters and shooters on his family's tobacco farm. He spent much of his childhood exploring, hunting, and roaming the backwoods of the Southeastern United States.  Even as a child, Franks aspired to a career in the military.  From an early age his father would let him shoot all of his guns once he was old enough to handle them safely.

At age 6, Franks received and quickly became proficient with his first BB gun. A few years later he got his first .410 shotgun and a .22 rifle, leading to his career in shooting. He continued to push himself to be a better shooter and spent a lot of his time in the woods hunting.

US Navy Career 

Seeking to further his skills with firearms, Franks sought out special training with the Navy. Initially he trained as an Operations Specialist and later applied to and was accepted in the Navy SEAL's BUD/S program. Unfortunately, he was unable to complete BUD/S due to medical reasons, but that did not stop his drive.  Franks graduated from the Navy Expeditionary Combat Skills and Practical Weapons courses and Anti-Terrorism Force Protection/Deadly Force Training.  He continued to work as an Operations Specialist and Navy Rescue Swimmer on six overseas deployments including tours in Afghanistan in 2009, 2010 and 2011.  While in Afghanistan Jamie was assigned to a Counter-IED task force.

After Season 2 of Top Shot, Jamie became the EOD Mobile Unit-3 SAILOR of the Year in 2010 and was hand-selected to be an Expeditionary Small Arms Marksmanship Instructor (SAMI).
In 2017 Jamie Franks was selected for advancement to Navy Chief Petty Officer based on his record of sustained superior performance in the Navy.

Top Shot 

In 2011, Jamie Franks appeared in Top Shot Season 2 on the History Channel. Franks was selected by the team captain and was a member of the Red team. As a skilled shooter and fierce competitor, Franks made it all the way to the individual portion of the competition where he was given a Green shirt. Franks was eliminated in Week 11, when he went up against the eventual Top Shot Season 2 Winner, Chris Reed, in the "Down to the Wire" Challenge.

Franks was brought back in 2013 to compete in Top Shot Season 5 titled Top Shot All Stars. After another long run against the elite competitors, Franks was eliminated in Week 7, when he shot against Gary Quesenberry in the "Thread the Needle" Challenge.

Competitive Shooting Career 

Since competition on Top Shot, Franks has continued his competitive shooting career in multi-gun. He has competed in the 3-Gun National Semi Pro Series where he won one match, and finished in the Top Five eight times and finished among the Top 10 eleven times.

References 

Sportspeople from Raleigh, North Carolina